VkTrace is an interactive tracefile debugger for the Vulkan API by LunarG. It was renamed on August 27, 2015 from GLAVE.

Introduction

See also 
 VOGL

References 

Debuggers
Free software
Free software programmed in C++

Valve Corporation
Video game development software for Linux